Stare Czarnowo  (formerly ) is a village in Gryfino County, West Pomeranian Voivodeship, in north-western Poland. It is the seat of the gmina (administrative district) called Gmina Stare Czarnowo.

The village has a population of 623.

Stare Czarnowo's main historic landmark it the Church of Our Lady Help of Christians, which dates back to the 16th century.

From 1871 to 1945 the area was part of Germany. For the history of the region, see History of Pomerania.

Notable people 
 Ryszard Dawidowicz (born 1960) a Polish former cyclist. He competed in two events at the 1988 Summer Olympics

References

Stare Czarnowo

it:Stare Czarnowo